The Hwange Solar Power Station, also Cross Mabale Solar Power Station, is a  solar power plant in Zimbabwe. The power station was initially commercially commissioned as a 5 MW power station in 2021. It is owned and was developed by SolGas Energy, a Zimbabwean independent power producer. The off-taker is Zimbabwe Electricity Transmission and Distribution Company (ZETDC), which integrates the energy into the national grid. A 25-year power purchase agreement governs the sale and purchase of electricity between SolGas Energy and ZETDC.

Location
The power station is located in the community of Cross Mabale, in the city of Hwange, in Hwange District, in Matabeleland North Province, in western Zimbabwe.

Overview
The power station is designed to have capacity of 50 megawatts, developed in several phases. The first phase was of 5 megawatts. As of July 2022, the power station was entering constriction of the second phase of 10 megawatts to bring new total capacity to 15 MW. Subsequent phases are expected to expand the power station to the designed capacity.

Construction
The first phase of the this project, with capacity of 5 MW, cost US$7.5 million. The contractors were Soventix SA, Excess Africa and Proconics, all South African companies.

Financing
The development project has received funding support from several  partners. These have included Old Mutual, ANF Capital, Ainos Ngadya, Mushoriwa-Pasi Corporate Attorneys and Stanbic Bank.
Old Mutual Investments Group also acquired 49 percent shareholding in SolGas Energy in 2017.

See also

List of power stations in Zimbabwe

References

External links
 Website of Solgas Energy

Solar power stations in Zimbabwe
Hwange District
Matabeleland North Province